Emily Hill (5 September 1847 – 27 August 1930) was a New Zealand teacher, temperance worker and suffragist.

Biography

Hill was born on 5 September 1847 in Lye, Worcestershire, England. She immigrated to Christchurch in 1873 with her husband Henry Hill, who had proposed to her less than a month before their departure for New Zealand. On 11 October 1875 she received her teacher's certificate from the education office of Canterbury, New Zealand. Between 1875 and 1878, he was headmaster at Christchurch East School and she was in charge of the infants' department. They moved to Napier, where she became prominent in women's suffrage.

Hill died on 27 August 1930 in Napier.

References

1847 births
1930 deaths
New Zealand schoolteachers
New Zealand temperance activists
New Zealand suffragists